Animecon is anime convention in Finland, held annually over a weekend in varying Finnish cities.

Animecon was organized as a joint project between anime clubs throughout Finland, facilitated by the communications hub Suomen Animeunioni (The Finnish Anime Union). The convention was first established in 1999 as an outgrowth of the science fiction anime fandom of the sci-fi convention Finncon, expanded into a separate event about anime in general. Animecon and Finncon have been held in conjunction, sharing premises but no events; they even often held separate opening ceremonies. In 2012 Animecon was held at the city of Kuopio for a first time and the convention has remained there since then.

The two drew some 5200 visitors in 2004 and 5500 in 2006, peaking at 5000 on Saturday during the three-day event. After the 2007 conventions, an organizer cited the number of visitors as an estimated 7000. Animecon II was the first major cosplay event in Finland,  and the practice has been noted for its abundance in later ones.

History

Event history

References

External links

 Official site
 Animecon picture archive, incl. cosplay competitions

Anime conventions
Entertainment events in Finland
Recurring events established in 1999
1999 establishments in Finland
Annual events in Finland